John Moffat Fugui (9 September 1961 – 22 December 2022) was a Solomon Islands politician.

Life and career
Fugui was born on 9 September 1961. He obtained his first Master's degree at the University of Canterbury in New Zealand, then two more at the University of Hawai'i in the United States, where he was enrolled in a PhD program. He subsequently worked as a political adviser to the Solomon Islands government.

His career in national politics began when he was elected to Parliament as the member for Central Honiara (the capital city) in the August 2010 general election, standing as an independent candidate. He was then appointed Minister for the Environment, Climate Change, Disaster Management and Meteorology in Prime Minister Danny Philip's Cabinet. When Gordon Darcy Lilo replaced Philip as Prime Minister in November 2011, Fugui retained his position in government.

On 22 October 2012, Fugui left the government. He announced that he had resigned because he had had no permanent secretary for seven months; Prime Minister Lilo stated that he had sacked him for siding with the Opposition. Lilo replaced him with Bradley Tovosia.

Following the 2014 general election, in which he retained his seat, Fugui was elected Deputy Speaker of the National Parliament, on 17 December. On 14 February 2020, he was stripped of his title as a Member of Parliament for Central Honiara Constituency due to evidence of misconduct.

In 2021, Fugui was appointed the first Solomon Islands Ambassador to China, he arrived in China on 22 May.

Fugui died on 22 December 2022, of cardiac arrest, at the age of 61, in Beijing during the COVID-19 pandemic in Beijing. He was the seventh foreign diplomat in China to die in two years.

References

1961 births
2022 deaths
Members of the National Parliament of the Solomon Islands
People from Honiara
University of Hawaiʻi at Mānoa alumni
University of Canterbury alumni
Ambassadors of the Solomon Islands to China
Deaths from the COVID-19 pandemic in China 
Environment ministers of the Solomon Islands
Education ministers of the Solomon Islands